Siphesihle Ntuli is a South African field hockey coach. At the 2020 Summer Olympics he assistant coached the South Africa men's national field hockey team and coach South Africa men Junior World Cup.

He brother, Nqobile, also represents South Africa in field hockey.

Coach

Club
 2018, University of KwaZulu-Natal - Men field hockey (head coach)
 2018–present, University of Pretoria - Men field hockey (head coach)
 2016-2018, Drakensberg Dragons (head coach)
 2016  
 2017 
 2018 
 2019

South Africa
 2018, South Africa U18 (head coach) 
African Youth Games 2018 
 2021, South Africa U21 (head coach)
2021 Men's FIH Hockey Junior World Cup, 9th
 2018–present, South Africa (assistant coach)

References

External links

Living people
South African field hockey coaches
Alumni of Kearsney College
Year of birth missing (living people)